Frenzied Computer Resonance is a various artists compilation album released in 1994 by Fifth Colvmn Records. The collection comprises tracks by Acumen, Chemlab, haloblack and Perceptual Outer Dimensions, which were released on their albums Transmissions from Eville (1994),  Burn Out at the Hydrogen Bar (1993), Tension Filter (1994) and The Journey to Planet POD (1994).

Track listing

Personnel
Adapted from the Frenzied Computer Resonance liner notes.

 Klacorous Inebirtatus – cover art, illustrations, design

Release history

References

External links 
 Frenzied Computer Resonance at Discogs (list of releases)

1994 compilation albums
Fifth Colvmn Records compilation albums